Thune may refer to:

People
Andreas Lauritz Thune (1848–1920), Norwegian engineer and businessman
Gro Hillestad Thune, Norwegian jurist and politician for the Labour Party
Harald Thune, Norwegian jurist, civil servant and elected official
John Thune, Republican senior U.S. Senator from the state of South Dakota
John Thune (Norwegian politician), Norwegian politician for the Christian Democratic Party
Nick Thune, American actor, writer, guitarist and stand up comedian
Nils Thune (1898–1988), Norwegian politician for the Centre Party
Nils Nilsen Thune (1880–1950), Norwegian jurist and civil servant
Nils Trondsen Thune, Norwegian politician
Scott Thunes, American punk rock bass guitarist
Vegard Thune, Norwegian politician for the Conservative Party
Wolfgang Thüne, German gymnast

Other
Thunes Mekaniske Værksted A/S,  Norwegian manufacturing company
Thune (station), light rail station on the Oslo Tramway
The Mirrors of Tuzun Thune, short story by American author Robert E. Howard about Kull of Atlantis
Thune (river), a river of North Rhine-Westphalia, Germany
Thune Dam, a dam in Botswana on a tributary of the Motloutse River that is also named Thune

Norwegian-language surnames